Delarge is a French surname and may refer to:

 Alex DeLarge, a fictional character in Stanley Kubrick's film A Clockwork Orange (based on by Anthony Burgess' novel)
 Dzon Delarge (born 1990), Congolese footballer
 Fernand Delarge (born 1903), Belgian boxer
 Jean Delarge (1906–1977), Belgian professional boxer
 Jean Delarge (athlete) (1893–1992), Belgian middle-distance runner

See also
 Robert C. De Large (1842–1874), a United States politician from South Carolina
 Delage (disambiguation)

Surnames of French origin